The Circuito cittadino dell'EUR is a street circuit located in the EUR neighborhood in Rome, Italy. It is used for the Rome ePrix of the single-seater, electrically powered Formula E championship. It was first used on 14 April 2018 for the 2018 Rome ePrix.

Layout

The track was firstly  in length and features 21 turns. A circuit around the EUR district was previously proposed to host a Formula One Grand Prix in both 1985 and 2009.

Also, both the start straight and finish straight are changed. This layout provides longer and faster straights in order to improve opportunities for overtaking.

Lap records 

The official race lap records at the Circuito Cittadino dell'EUR are listed as:

References

Formula E circuits
Motorsport venues in Italy
Rome ePrix